Ali Rowghani (born 21 January 1973) is an Iranian-born American businessman.

He was raised in Dallas, Texas, where he attended the St. Mark's School of Texas, graduating in 1991. He received his undergraduate degree from Stanford University in 1996, and his MBA from Stanford in 2002.

Rowghani worked in finance at Pixar for nine years, serving as Chief Financial Officer between 2002 and 2008. He helped with the restructuring of Disney Animation with the entrance of John Lasseter and Ed Catmull. In 2008, he left Pixar to become CFO  for Twitter, a post he held for four years until he became Twitter's Chief operating officer. Steve Jobs attempted to dissuade him from joining Twitter. He left Twitter in 2014.

In November 2014, Rowghani joined Y Combinator as a part-time partner focusing on helping YC alumni scale their companies. He launched Continuity, a $700 million investment growth-stage fund, which was closed in 2015. He is now a managing partner of YC Continuity at Y Combinator.

See also 
Notable alumni of St. Mark's School of Texas

References 

1973 births
Living people
American computer businesspeople
Businesspeople in information technology
Iranian businesspeople
American people of Iranian descent
Stanford University alumni
Businesspeople from Oakland, California
American chief operating officers
American chief financial officers
St. Mark's School (Texas) alumni
Stanford Graduate School of Business alumni
21st-century American businesspeople